DNEG (formerly known as Double Negative and stylized as D N E G) is a British visual effects, computer animation, and stereo conversion studio that was founded in 1998 in London, and rebranded as DNEG in 2014 after a merger with Indian VFX company Prime Focus, it was named after the letters "D" and "Neg" from their former name.

The company has received seven Academy Awards for its work on the films Inception, Interstellar, Ex Machina, Blade Runner 2049,  First Man, Tenet and Dune.  In addition, DNEG has received BAFTA awards for Inception, Harry Potter and the Deathly Hallows – Part 2 , Interstellar, Blade Runner 2049, Tenet, Dune and Black Mirrors "Metalhead", and Visual Effects Society awards for its work on films such as The Dark Knight Rises, Sherlock Holmes, Inception, Interstellar, Dunkirk, Blade Runner 2049, Altered Carbon, First Man, Chernobyl, Last Night In Soho, Foundation and Dune. It has also received Primetime Emmy Awards for its work on Dreamkeeper, Chernobyl and season 3 of Star Trek: Discovery.

DNEG is headquartered in Fitzrovia, London with additional locations in Vancouver, Mumbai, Los Angeles, Chennai, Montréal, Mohali, Bangalore, Toronto and Sydney (opening in 2023).

History
Double Negative first opened its doors in 1998 in London. Founded by a small group of industry professionals, including Peter Chiang (Senior VFX Supervisor), Matt Holben (Joint MD), Alex Hope (Joint MD) and Paul Franklin (Senior VFX Supervisor), it has grown from a small team to 8,000 members of staff worldwide.

Over the years, DNEG has worked on over 200 movies and developed working relationships with a number of leading directors. Its first project was Pitch Black, released in 2000. Since then, DNEG's work can be seen in recurring franchises like Harry Potter, Fantastic Beasts, Marvel Cinematic Universe, James Bond, Jason Bourne, Fast and Furious, Mission: Impossible and the DC Extended Universe. DNEG has worked on award-winning projects such as Inception, Interstellar, Ex Machina, Dunkirk, Blade Runner 2049, Black Mirror – Metalhead, Altered Carbon, First Man, Chernobyl, Tenet, Star Trek: Discovery (Season 3), and Dune.

DNEG's visual effects work has been honored with seven Academy Awards, seven BAFTAs, eighteen Visual Effects Society Awards and three Primetime Emmy Awards.

International expansion 
In 2009, Double Negative opened its Singapore office, and closed it in March 2016.

In July 2014, Prime Focus World merged with Double Negative; the merged company was rebranded as DNEG. The two companies announced the upcoming opening of a Mumbai branch following the merger.

Since 2014, DNEG has opened new facilities in Vancouver, Mumbai, Los Angeles, Chennai, Montréal, Mohali, Bangalore and Toronto.

In August 2021, UK-based firm Novator Capital Advisors invested $250 million in Prime Focus Limited, DNEG's parent company.

On January 25, 2022, DNEG announced its entry into a definitive business combination agreement with Sports Ventures Acquisition Corp. (Nasdaq: AKIC). Upon the closing of the business combination, subject to customary closing conditions including the approval of the stockholders of Sports Ventures Acquisition Corp., which was expected in the first half of 2022, the combined public company would be named DNEG. The merger was called off in June 2022.

In November 2022, DNEG announced plans to open a location in Sydney, Australia, where its VFX and animation divisions will work. The new studio will open in 2023 in Pyrmont and be headed by VFX supervisor Andrew Jackson. It will lead the visual effects for George Miller's Furiosa.

Services and divisions

Visual effects 
DNEG started as a visual effects (VFX) studio specialised in VFX for feature films. Over the years its offering expanded to include VFX and animation for feature film and television, and stereo conversion.

In 2013 the company launched its Episodic VFX team dedicated to the creation of VFX for television, OTT and streaming providers and designed to allow content producers and networks access to DNEG's team and infrastructure for non-theatrical projects.

Animation 

DNEG Animation (formerly known as DNEG Feature Animation) was founded in April 2014 as DNEG Feature Animation after DNEG formed a deal with Locksmith Animation, with Tom Jacomb leading the studio. It provides animation services alongside IP creators and filmmakers for both feature and episodic animated projects. A Queen's Guard soldier with a giant pencil sometimes alongside a short six-leg robot guard are the mascots of the studio. Its first project was the short film Mr. Spam Gets A New Hat, directed by Oscar-winning filmmaker William Joyce and released in 2021, which won 'Best Animation' at 2021 New York Shorts International Film Festival, ‘Best Animated Short‘ at Cleveland International Film Festival, ‘Best Animation‘ at LA Shorts Festival, ‘Best Animated Short‘ at Cordillera International Film Festival and ‘Best 3D Narrative Short‘ at SPARK ANIMATION 2021. Its first feature film was Ron's Gone Wrong, co-produced with Locksmith Animation for 20th Century Studios, also released in 2021, which won for 'Best Longform' at the British Animation Awards (BAA). With the trailer release of Mr. Spam Gets A New Hat in October 2021, and by early 2022, the studio was renamed to DNEG Animation. Most recently, they worked on the Netflix television special Entergalactic, created by Scott “Kid Cudi” Mescudi and Kenya Barris and released in September 2022. Projects currently in production include Under the Boardwalk for Paramount Animation, an adaptation of The Great Gatsby, Garfield, for which DNEG is a producer alongside Alcon Entertainment for Sony Pictures, That Christmas, a co-production with Locksmith Animation, and Nimona, an adaptation of the webcomic of the same name by ND Stevenson for Netflix and Annapurna Pictures; in the production of Nimona, DNEG would take over animation from Blue Sky Studios after the company was shut down by then-owner The Walt Disney Company before their production was completed.

ReDefine 
DNEG ReDefine was launched in 2019 to provide creative visual effects and animation services both to expanding international markets and to filmmakers and streaming companies.

Stereo 
DNEG Stereo (formerly known as Prime Focus World) was the first in the world to convert a full Hollywood film from 2-D to 3-D and has since become one of the largest stereo conversion companies in the motion picture industry.

Virtual Production 
DNEG Virtual Production is a global, end-to-end virtual production service. It offers filmmakers and content creators access to a full range of real-time production services – from script breakdown, through development / pre-production, production and post-production, to final picture delivery. DNEG Virtual Production has delivered virtual production services for Andy Serkis’ Venom: Let There Be Carnage, Keneth Branagh’s Death on the Nile and David Leitch’s Bullet Train.

Filmography

Feature films

1990s and 2000s

2010s

2020s

Upcoming films

Television series and specials

See also
 Industrial Light & Magic
 Moving Picture Company (MPC)
 Digital Domain
 Wētā FX
 Wētā Workshop
 Framestore
 Blue Sky Studios
 Animal Logic
 Rhythm & Hues
 Sony Pictures Imageworks
 Pacific Data Images
 Image Engine
 Visual Works

References

1998 establishments in England
British companies established in 1998
Mass media companies established in 1998
Companies based in the City of Westminster
Television and film post-production companies
Film production companies of the United Kingdom
Mass media companies based in London
Visual effects companies